Acytostelium is a genus of dictyostelid.

The genus Acytostelium inhabit surface humus and leaf mold of forest soils and are widely distributed in different forests of the world. 

Species include:
 Acytostelium aggregatum Cavender & Vadell 2000
 Acytostelium amazonicum Cavender & Vadell 2000
 Acytostelium anastomosans Cavender et al. 2005
 Acytostelium digitatum Cavender & Vadell 2000
 Acytostelium irregularosporum Hagiw. 1971
 Acytostelium leptosomum Raper 1956
 Acytostelium longisorophorum Cavender et al. 2005
 Acytostelium magniphorum Cavender & Vadell 2000
 Acytostelium magnisorum Cavender et al. 2005
 Acytostelium minutissimum Cavender & Vadell 2000
 Acytostelium pendulum Cavender & Vadell 2000
 Acytostelium reticulatum Cavender & Vadell 2000
 Acytostelium serpentarium Cavender et al. 2005
 Acytostelium singulare Cavender et al. 2005
 Acytostelium subglobosum Cavender 1976

References

Mycetozoa
Amoebozoa genera